The 2017–18 Brisbane Roar W-League season was the club's tenth season in the W-League, the premier competition for women's football in Australia. The team played home games both at A.J. Kelly Park and Suncorp Stadium.

Players

Transfers in

Transfers out

Squad statistics

Competitions

W-League

League table

Results summary

Results by round

Fixtures

Finals series

See also 
 2017–18 W-League

References

Brisbane Roar FC (A-League Women) seasons
Brisbane Roar